The Wabash Bridge is a railroad bridge spanning the Mississippi River near Hannibal, Missouri, United States.

Wabash Bridge may also refer to:

 Wabash Bridge (St. Charles, Missouri), a railroad bridge spanning the Missouri River near St. Charles, Missouri, United States
 Wabash Bridge (Pittsburgh), a former railroad bridge spanning the Monongahela River near Pittsburgh, Pennsylvania, United States
 Wabash Avenue Bridge, an automobile and pedestrian bridge spanning the Chicago River in downtown Chicago, Illinois, United States
 Wabash Memorial Bridge, an automobile bridge spanning the Wabash River in Posey County, Indiana, United States